Wicked (also known as Wicked: Part One) is an upcoming epic musical fantasy film directed by Jon M. Chu and adapted to the screen by Winnie Holzman and Stephen Schwartz. It is the first of a two-part film adaptation of their 2003 stage musical of the same name, which is in turn based on the 1995 novel of the same name by Gregory Maguire and characters from L. Frank Baum's The Wonderful Wizard of Oz. The film stars Cynthia Erivo and Ariana Grande, with Jonathan Bailey, Ethan Slater, Jeff Goldblum and Michelle Yeoh in supporting roles. Set in the Land of Oz, the film revolves around Elphaba, a green-skinned woman, and explores the path that leads her to become the Wicked Witch of the West.

In 2012, Universal Pictures announced the film's development with Marc Platt as a producer. After a long development and multiple delays due to the COVID-19 pandemic, Chu was hired to direct, with Erivo and Grande cast in their respective roles in 2021. Principal photography began in December 2022 in England.

Wicked is scheduled for release on November 27, 2024, while a sequel will be released the following year.

Premise
The story of how a green-skinned woman framed by the Wizard of Oz becomes the Wicked Witch of the West.

Cast
 Cynthia Erivo as Elphaba Thropp
 Ariana Grande as Glinda Upland
 Jonathan Bailey as Fiyero Tigelaar
 Jeff Goldblum as The Wonderful Wizard of Oz
 Ethan Slater as Boq
 Michelle Yeoh as Madame Morrible
 Marissa Bode as Nessarose Thropp
 Bowen Yang as Pfannee
 Bronwyn James as ShenShen
 Keala Settle as Miss Coddle
 Aaron Teoh as Avaric
 Colin Michael Carmichael as Professor Nikidik
 TBA as Doctor Dillamond
 TBA as Chistery
 TBA as Witch's Father
 TBA as Witch's Mother
 TBA as Midwife

Production

Development

In 2003, the Gregory Maguire novel Wicked: The Life and Times of the Wicked Witch of the West was adapted as the Broadway musical Wicked. The musical was produced by Universal Pictures' stage division and directed by Joe Mantello, with musical staging by Wayne Cilento. The Broadway production has inspired long-run productions in Chicago, London's West End, San Francisco, and Los Angeles in the United States, as well as Germany and Japan. It was nominated for ten Tony Awards, winning three, and is the 6th longest-running Broadway show in history, with over 6,100 performances. The original Broadway production starred Idina Menzel as Elphaba and Kristin Chenoweth as Glinda.

In a 2009 interview, Maguire stated that he had sold the rights to ABC to make an independent non-musical TV adaptation of Wicked. It would not be based on Winnie Holzman's script. On January 9, 2011, it was reported by Entertainment Weekly that ABC would be teaming up with Salma Hayek and her production company to create a TV miniseries of Wicked based solely on Maguire's novel. No further information, such as casting, had been revealed yet.

Original Broadway cast members Kristin Chenoweth as Glinda and Idina Menzel as Elphaba were mentioned as possible film leads. Lea Michele and Amy Adams were also rumored to be potential leads. Potential writers included Winnie Holzman and Stephen Schwartz, while J. J. Abrams, Rob Marshall and Ryan Murphy were mentioned as possible candidates for director. In December 2012, following the success of Les Misérables, Marc Platt, also a producer of the stage version, announced the film was going ahead, later confirming the film was aiming for a 2016 release. After a long development, Universal announced in 2017 that the film would be released in theaters on December 20, 2019, with Stephen Daldry directing.

Pre-production
In May 2017, Schwartz stated that the film would feature "at least two" new songs. On August 31, 2018, Universal put the film on hold, due to production scheduling, and gave the film adaptation of Cats the release date formerly held by the film. On February 8, 2019, Universal announced a new release date of December 22, 2021, for the Wicked film. On April 1, 2020, Universal put the film on hold once again due to Universal shifting release dates amidst the COVID-19 pandemic, and gave Sing 2 the 2021 release date. On October 20, 2020, it was announced that Daldry had left the production due to scheduling conflicts. On February 2, 2021, it was announced that Jon M. Chu will take over as director. In August, Alice Brooks was confirmed as the film's cinematographer, after working with Chu before on the film version of In the Heights.

In November, Ariana Grande and Cynthia Erivo were cast to portray Glinda and Elphaba, respectively. In June 2022, Chu confirmed the hiring of Nathan Crowley as production designer. On September 21, 2022, it was reported that Jonathan Bailey had joined the cast as Fiyero. In October 2022, it was announced that Jeff Goldblum was in final talks to star as The Wizard. Goldblum remained in talks by December, when Ethan Slater, Michelle Yeoh, Marissa Bode, Bowen Yang, Bronwyn James, Keala Settle, Aaron Teoh and Colin Michael Carmichael were added to the cast.

About preparing for the role of Elphaba, Erivo said to Variety, while expressing her desire to see the stage version on Broadway again before filming: "I'm relearning everything ... I want to go and see it again. ... When I get to New York at some point I'll pop in and see the show again, that'll be my fifth time." She also said at that time that discussions were underway on what the film will look like, particularly its production design and visual style, while confirming the hiring of Paul Tazewell as costume designer. Her request to him for Elphaba's costume when she becomes the Wicked Witch of the West involved "a Jean Paul Gaultier collection with a 'new world, kind of gilded age' feeling."

Filming
Principal photography was set to commence in June 2022 at the Sky Studios Elstree facilities in the United Kingdom. In July 2021, Stephen Schwartz indicated there were plans to film in Atlanta in 2021. On April 26, 2022, Chu announced the adaptation will be filmed in two parts, saying:
In June 2022, Stephen Schwartz added, while confirming that a new song will be written for one of the two films:

On July 18, 2022, it was revealed that with the filming process settled at the newly-built Sky Studios in Elstree, England, rehearsals would begin in August with principal photography beginning in November. On December 9, 2022, Chu confirmed on Twitter that filming had begun.

A 23 September 2022 Planning Statement, in support of a planning application submitted on behalf of Western Sky Limited, indicated that outdoor filming would occur at a site being developed at Ivinghoe Turf in Ivinghoe, Buckinghamshire, UK. The planned shooting dates are between 6 April 2023 and 25 July 2023.

Release
Wicked: Part One was originally scheduled to be released theatrically on December 25, 2024, by Universal Pictures, but on March 14, 2023, it was announced that it will be moved up and is now set to be released on November 27, 2024 to avoid competition with Avatar 3 and Sonic the Hedgehog 3.

Sequel
Originally announced as one film, Wicked was split into two films in April 2022. The sequel, Wicked: Part Two, is scheduled to be released on December 25, 2025.

References

External links
 

2024 films
American epic films
American fantasy films
American musical fantasy films
American musical films
British epic films
British fantasy films
British musical fantasy films
British musical films
English-language films
Film productions suspended due to the COVID-19 pandemic
Films about animals
Films about friendship
Films about lions
Films about magic and magicians
Films about sisters
Films about tornadoes
Films about witchcraft
Films based on adaptations
Films based on American novels
Films based on fantasy novels
Films based on multiple works of a series
Films based on multiple works
Films based on musicals
Films based on The Wizard of Oz
Films directed by Jon M. Chu
Films postponed due to the COVID-19 pandemic
Films produced by Marc E. Platt
Films shot in the United Kingdom
Films with live action and animation
Musical fantasy films
Musicals by Stephen Schwartz
Universal Pictures films
Upcoming films
The Wicked Years
The Wizard of Oz (1939 film)